Ahangar Kola or Ahangar Kala or Ahangarkala may refer to several places in Iran:
 Ahangar Kola, Amol
 Ahangar Kola, Dabudasht, Amol County
 Ahangar Kola-ye Olya, Amol County
 Ahangar Kola-ye Sofla, Amol County
 Ahangar Kola, Babol
 Ahangar Kola, Gatab, Babol County
 Ahangar Kola, Behshahr
 Ahangar Kola, Chalus
 Ahangar Kola, Mahmudabad
 Ahangar Kola, Qaem Shahr
 Ahangar Kola, Nowkand Kola, Qaem Shahr County
 Ahangar Kola, Savadkuh
 Ahangar Kola, Simorgh